We Love to Sing About Jesus is the third studio album by country music artists George Jones and Tammy Wynette released on November 6, 1972, by Epic Records.

Reception
Stephen Thomas Erlewine of AllMusic derides the album, calling it "overproduced, overwrought and under-written" and, while praising their rendition of Tom T. Hall's "Me and Jesus", laments that "the bombastic production gets a little nerve-wracking about halfway through the album, and by the end of the record the music hasn't provided much inspiration. In all, a wasted opportunity."

Track listing 
 "We Love to Sing About Jesus" (Tammy Wynette, Earl Montgomery) – 1:54
 "Old Fashioned Singing" (Wynette, Earl Montgomery) – 2:50
 "He Is My Everything" (Dallas Frazier) – 2:55
 "Me and Jesus" (Tom T. Hall) – 3:14
 "Noah and the Ark" (Carmol Taylor, Jenny Strickland) – 2:26
 "Let's All Go Down to the River" (Sue Richards, Earl Montgomery) – 2:35
 "Let's All Sing Ourselves to Glory" (Earl Montgomery) – 2:11
 "Talkin' About Jesus" (Earl Montgomery) – 2:25
 "When Jesus Takes His Children Home" (Duke Goff, Mark Sherrill) – 1:46
 "Everything's Gonna Be Alright" (Bobby Womack, Carmol Taylor) – 1:52
 "Show Him That You Love Him" (Carmol Taylor, A. Wilson) – 1:54

References

External links
 George Jones' Official Website
 Tammy Wynette's Official Site
 Record Label

1972 albums
George Jones albums
Tammy Wynette albums
Albums produced by Billy Sherrill
Epic Records albums
Vocal duet albums